Portholme (or Port Holme on Ordnance Survey mapping) is a  biological Site of Special Scientific Interest between Huntingdon and Godmanchester in Cambridgeshire, England. It is a Nature Conservation Review site, and a Special Area of Conservation.

The site is an alluvial flood meadow, and one of the largest areas of grassland which is still traditionally managed as a Lammas meadow. Watercourses have some unusual invertebrates, including the nationally restricted dragonfly Libellula fulva. The meadow is managed by cutting followed by grazing, and it is flooded in winter and early spring.

There is access from footpaths and roads including Mill Common.

Between April and October 1918, the meadow was used as a Training Depot Station (designated No. 211 TDS) by the Royal Air Force. Aircraft were moved to RAF Scopwick in October 1918.

References

Meadows in the United Kingdom
Sites of Special Scientific Interest in Cambridgeshire
Nature Conservation Review sites
Special Areas of Conservation in England